In mathematics and particularly in dynamic systems, an initial condition, in some contexts called a seed value, is a value of an evolving variable at some point in time designated as the initial time (typically denoted t = 0). For a system of order k (the number of time lags in discrete time, or the order of the largest derivative in continuous time) and dimension n (that is, with n different evolving variables, which together can be denoted by an n-dimensional coordinate vector), generally nk initial conditions are needed in order to trace the system's variables forward through time. 

In both differential equations in continuous time and difference equations in discrete time, initial conditions affect the value of the dynamic variables (state variables) at any future time. In continuous time, the problem of finding a closed form solution for the state variables as a function of time and of the initial conditions is called the initial value problem. A corresponding problem exists for discrete time situations. While a closed form solution is not always possible to obtain, future values of a discrete time system can be found by iterating forward one time period per iteration, though rounding error may make this impractical over long horizons.

Linear system

Discrete time

A linear matrix difference equation of the homogeneous (having no constant term) form  has closed form solution  predicated on the vector  of initial conditions on the individual variables that are stacked into the vector;  is called the vector of initial conditions or simply the initial condition, and contains nk pieces of information, n being the dimension of the vector X and k = 1 being the number of time lags in the system. The initial conditions in this linear system do not affect the qualitative nature of the future behavior of the state variable X; that behavior is stable or unstable based on the eigenvalues of the matrix A but not based on the initial conditions.

Alternatively, a dynamic process in a single variable x having multiple time lags is 

Here the dimension is n = 1 and the order is k, so the necessary number of initial conditions to trace the system through time, either iteratively or via closed form solution, is nk = k. Again the initial conditions do not affect the qualitative nature of the variable's long-term evolution. The solution of this equation is found by using its characteristic equation  to obtain the latter's k solutions, which are the characteristic values  for use in the solution equation

Here the constants  are found by solving a system of k different equations based on this equation, each using one of k different values of t for which the specific initial condition  Is known.

Continuous time

A differential equation system of the first order with n variables stacked in a vector X is

Its behavior through time can be traced with a closed form solution conditional on an initial condition vector . The number of required initial pieces of information is the dimension n of the system times the order k = 1 of the system, or n. The initial conditions do not affect the qualitative behavior (stable or unstable) of the system.

A single kth order linear equation in a single variable x is

Here the number of initial conditions necessary for obtaining a closed form solution is the dimension n = 1 times the order k, or simply k. In this case the k initial pieces of information will typically not be different values of the variable x at different points in time, but rather the values of x and its first k – 1 derivatives, all at some point in time such as time zero. The initial conditions do not affect the qualitative nature of the system's behavior. The characteristic equation of this dynamic equation is  whose solutions are the characteristic values  these are used in the solution equation

This equation and its first k – 1 derivatives form a system of k equations that can be solved for the k parameters  given the known initial conditions on x and its k – 1 derivatives' values at some time t.

Nonlinear systems

Nonlinear systems can exhibit a substantially richer variety of behavior than linear systems can. In particular, the initial conditions can affect whether the system diverges to infinity or whether it converges to one or another attractor of the system. Each attractor, a (possibly disconnected) region of values that some dynamic paths approach but never leave, has a (possibly disconnected) basin of attraction such that state variables with initial conditions in that basin (and nowhere else) will evolve toward that attractor. Even nearby initial conditions could be in basins of attraction of different attractors (see for example Newton's method#Basins of attraction).

Moreover, in those nonlinear systems showing chaotic behavior, the evolution of the variables exhibits sensitive dependence on initial conditions: the iterated values of any two very nearby points on the same strange attractor, while each remaining on the attractor, will diverge from each other over time. Thus even on a single attractor the precise values of the initial conditions make a substantial difference for the future positions of the iterates. This feature makes accurate simulation of future values difficult, and impossible over long horizons, because stating the initial conditions with exact precision is seldom possible and because rounding error is inevitable after even only a few iterations from an exact initial condition.

Empirical laws and initial conditions

See also
Boundary condition
Initialization vector, in cryptography

References

External links
 

Recurrence relations
Differential equations